The 2020–21 Illinois Fighting Illini men's basketball team represented the University of Illinois in the 2020–21 NCAA Division I men's basketball season. Led by fourth-year head coach Brad Underwood, the Illini played their home games at the State Farm Center in Champaign, Illinois as members of the Big Ten Conference.  They finished the season 24–7, 16–4 in Big Ten play to finish in second place. They defeated Rutgers, Iowa, and Ohio State to win the Big Ten tournament and receive the conference's automatic bid to the NCAA tournament. As the No. 1 seed in the Midwest region, they defeated Drexel in the First Round before being upset by No. 8-seeded Loyola–Chicago.

Previous season
The Illini finished the 2019–20 season 21–10, 13–7 in Big Ten play to finish in fourth place. Their season ended when the Big Ten tournament and the NCAA tournament were canceled due to the coronavirus pandemic.

Offseason

Departures
On April 7, 2020, freshman big man Kofi Cockburn declared for the NBA draft, but did not hire an agent, leaving open the chance that he would return to school for his sophomore season. On April 16, sophomore guard Ayo Dosunmu also declared for the draft. Dosunmu did not hire an agent, but stated that he intended to stay in the draft. On July 31, Cockburn and Dosunmu announced they had withdrawn from the NBA draft and would return to Illinois for the season.

2020 Recruiting Class

2021 Recruiting Class

Roster

Schedule and results

|-
!colspan=12 style="background:#DF4E38; color:white;"| Non-Conference regular season

|-
!colspan=9 style="background:#DF4E38; color:#FFFFFF;"|Big Ten regular season

|-
!colspan=12 style="background:#DF4E38; color:white;"| Big Ten tournament

|-
!colspan=9 style="text-align: center; background:#DF4E38"|NCAA tournament

Source

Rankings

*AP does not release post-NCAA Tournament rankings^Coaches did not release a Week 1 poll.

References

2020–21 Big Ten Conference men's basketball season
2020-21
2020 in sports in Illinois
2021 in sports in Illinois
Illinois
2020-21